Alfred Walter Frank Blunt (24 September 1879 – 12 June 1957) was an English Anglican bishop. He was the second Bishop of Bradford from 1931 to 1955 and is best known for a speech that exacerbated the abdication crisis of King Edward VIII.

Birth and education
Blunt was born on 24 September 1879 in Saint-Malo, France, where he was brought up before his mother returned the family to England in 1887. He was younger son in second marriage of Captain Francis Theophilus Blunt (1837–1881) of the British colonial service, ultimately Chief Civil Commissioner for the Seychelles. His older brother was Edward Arthur Henry Blunt. He was privately educated by his widowed mother, and attended Church Hill preparatory school at Crondall near Farnham, Hampshire, before entering Marlborough College in 1893.

He entered Exeter College, Oxford, where he graduated Bachelor of Arts in 1901, receiving first-class honours in literae humaniores, and was promoted to Master of Arts in 1904. He was later granted by the same university the degrees of Bachelor of Divinity in 1918 and, honoris causa, Doctor of Divinity in 1932.

Teaching and priesthood
Blunt was elected as a tutorial Fellow of Exeter College in March 1902, and as Assistant Master of Wellington College later in 1902 before studying for priesthood at Cuddesdon Theological College. He was ordained deacon in 1904 and priest in 1905 by Francis Paget, Bishop of Oxford, in whose diocese he served as a licensed preacher until 1907, when he became curate at Carrington, Nottingham, an industrial parish. He became its perpetual curate, or vicar, in 1909. He also became examining chaplain to Edwyn Hoskyns (and his successor Bernard Heywood), Bishop of Southwell, its diocesan, from 1911 until 1927.

In 1917 he moved to Derby, to be Vicar of St Werburgh's, another industrial parish. He became honorary canon at Southwell Minster in 1918. In 1920 he was also appointed Rural Dean of Derby. In 1927, when a new Diocese of Derby was formed, he became in turn canon at Derby Cathedral and examining chaplain to Edmund Pearce, Bishop of Derby.

In churchmanship he was an Anglo-Catholic. Politically interested in social justice and a priest who preferred work in slum communities and with youth, he was a member of the Christian Social Union from 1907, and from the time of the general strike of 1926 a member of the Labour Party. While in Derby he became a friend of J. H. Thomas, a local Labour Member of Parliament and future cabinet minister.

Bishop of Bradford
In 1930, Blunt was offered but declined the See of Worcester before becoming Bishop of Bradford the following year. He was consecrated as a bishop on 25 July 1931 and enthroned on 30 November 1931.

He hosted the Anglo-Catholic Conference, over which he presided, at Bradford in 1934. Politically, he drifted leftward and during the Second World War advocated communism (although he criticised the way it was practiced in Soviet Russia) and supported the Beveridge Report in 1943. He became the president of the newly formed Council of Clergy and Ministers for Common Ownership in 1942.

Blunt's work continued, despite mental breakdowns as early as 1931, until he was forced to retire after a stroke in 1955.

Speech and abdication crisis

Blunt's speech was made to his diocesan conference on 1 December 1936. At this stage, the crisis had not come to the notice of the public and, though the press knew of it, they had not yet revealed it. The speech was mundane until Blunt talked about the coronation service:

He continued:

A Telegraph and Argus reporter, Ronald Harker, was present. He took his notes back to the office and, on conferring with his colleague Charles Leach, agreed that the national media might be interested and sent the story over the wire to the Press Association. Eight days later, King Edward VIII abdicated. When asked about it later, Blunt revealed that the comments he made had been intended to be a lament of the King's indifference to churchgoing. Like most other Britons, he had never even heard of Wallis Simpson. The Bishop's doubts about Edward VIII's piety stood in marked contrast with the views of some other clergy such as the Rev Robert Anderson Jardine, of Darlington, who several months later conducted the wedding ceremony of the Duke of Windsor and Wallis Warfield, as she was again known.

Personal and later life
He married, in 1909, Margaret Catharine (also known as Maggie), daughter of Lieutenant-Colonel J. Duke of the Indian Medical Service, and by her had two sons and two daughters.

Resigning his bishopric, he retired to York, where he died on 12 June 1957 aged seventy-seven. He was buried at Calverley, Yorkshire.

Publications
Sourced from Who Was Who and his sketch in Crockford's Clerical Directory 1957–58.

Studies in Apostolic Christianity (1909)
Apologies of Justin Martyr (1911)
Faith and the New Testament (1912)
The Faith of the Catholic Church (1916)
The Book of Acts (for the Clarendon Bible) (1922)
Israel before Christ (World's Manuals series) (1924)
The Book of Galatians (for Clarendon Bible) (1925)
Israel in World-History (World's Manuals series) (1927)
The Teaching of the Old Testament (1927)
The Ancient World (1928)
The Prophets of Israel (1929)
The Gospel of Mark (for Clarendon Bible) (1929)
C. of E., What does it Stand for? (1934)
Grace and Morals (1935)
The Gospels and the Critic (1936)
Our Need for God (1937)
God and Man (1937)
The Faith of the New Testament (1939)
For Beginners in Prayer (1941)
The Goodly Fellowship (1942)
What the Church Teaches (1942)
The Trials of Sickness (1946)
The Spirit of Life (1947)

See also

 Robert Anderson Jardine#An unprecedented marriage

 Protestant Truth Society#Varied piety assessments of the Duke and Duchess of Windsor

 Telegraph %26 Argus#1936 Abdication Crisis

References

Citations

Works cited

External links
National Portrait Gallery image

1957 deaths
1879 births
Alumni of Exeter College, Oxford
Anglo-Catholic bishops
Anglo-Catholic socialists
Bishops of Bradford (diocese)
Abdication of Edward VIII
English Anglo-Catholics
English Christian socialists
Labour Party (UK) people
People educated at Marlborough College
People from Calverley